Shahrara is a neighbourhood in north-west Tehran, the capital city of Iran. It is centred on the park bounded by Shahrara square (incorrectly filed as Shahr Asa by Google) and can be found at Google Maps.

References

Neighbourhoods in Tehran